Julie Ellsworth (born December 8, 1961) is an American politician from Idaho. She has been the treasurer of Idaho since 2019.

Ellsworth also was a Republican Idaho State Representative representing District 18 in the A seat from 2010 to 2012. Ellsworth has previously served in the Idaho House of Representatives from 1997 until 2006, three terms in Seat 13B and two terms in seat 18B.

Education
Ellsworth earned her bachelor's degree in education from Brigham Young University.

Elections

Idaho Treasurer

2018 
Ellsworth defeated Tom Kealey and Vicky McIntyre with 36.8% of the vote. Ellsworth was unopposed in the general election.

Idaho House of Representatives

2012 
Ellsworth was unopposed in the Republican primary.

In a general election rematch against Ward-Engelking, Ellsworth was defeated earning only 44.7% of the vote.

2010 
With Durst seeking the open senate seat, Ellsworth again ran for seat A, winning the Republican primary with 2,024 votes (64.5%) against Greg Ferch.

In her closest race, Ellsworth won the November 2, 2010, general election by just 9 votes with 6,429 votes (50.0%) against Janie Ward-Engelking (D).

2008 
Rather than seeking another contest with King, Ellsworth chose to run for seat A in the Republican primary and won with 1,544 votes (60.5%) against Gail Hartnett.

Ellsworth lost the general election to incumbent Democratic Representative Branden Durst by 431 votes.

2006 
Unopposed for the Republican primary

In their third contest, Phylis King defeated Ellsworth in the general election by nearly 700 votes.

2004 
Unopposed for the Republican primary.

Ellsworth won the general election with 9,751 votes (51.9%) defeating Phylis King for a second time.

2002 
Redistricted to District 18, Ellsworth won the three-way May 28, 2002, Republican primary with 2,552 votes (65.4%) against Cheryl A. Miller and Michael Law.

She won the general election with 7,178 votes (55.8%) against Phylis King.

2000 
Unopposed for the May 23, 2000, Republican primary.

She won the general election with 8,936 votes (56.6%) against George M. Klein (D).

1998 
Unopposed for the Republican primary.

She won the general election with 7,026 (55.9%) against Selina Shaw (D).

1996 
Ellsworth defeated incumbent Republican Representative Dave Baumann in the primary with 1,483 votes (51%), winning by 61 votes.

She won the general election with 8,427 votes (50.9%) against Kathleen Roos (D.)

References

External links

https://web.archive.org/web/20121103235151/http://www.julieellsworth.net/

 

1961 births
Brigham Young University alumni
Living people
Republican Party members of the Idaho House of Representatives
People from Boise, Idaho
State cabinet secretaries of Idaho
Women state legislators in Idaho
20th-century American politicians
20th-century American women politicians
21st-century American politicians
21st-century American women politicians